BZE may refer to:
Belize, UNDP country code
Beyond Zero Emissions, an Australian-based, not-for-profit climate change solutions think-tank
Philip S. W. Goldson International Airport, the largest airport in Belize
Benzoylecgonine, a drug metabolite